Gymnetron is a genus of beetles belonging to the family Curculionidae.

The species of this genus are found in Eurasia, Africa and Northern America.

Species:
 Gymnetron aenigma Caldara, 2003
 Gymnetron aequale Reitter, 1907

References

Curculionidae
Curculionidae genera